The 1979 Richmond WCT, also known by its sponsored name United Virginia Bank Classic, was a men's tennis tournament played on indoor carpet courts in Richmond, Virginia in the United States. The event was part WCT Tour which was incorporated into the 1979 Colgate-Palmolive Grand Prix circuit. It was the 14th edition of the tournament and was held from January 29 through February 4, 1979. First-seeded Björn Borg won the singles title.

Finals

Singles
 Björn Borg defeated  Guillermo Vilas 6–3, 6–1
 It was Borg's 1st singles title of the year and the 40th of his career.

Doubles
 Brian Gottfried /  John McEnroe defeated  Ion Ţiriac /  Guillermo Vilas 6–4, 6–3

References

External links
 ITF tournament edition details

Richmond WCT
Richmond WCT
Richmond WCT
Richmond WCT
Richmond WCT